The Florida State Seminoles women's softball team represents Florida State University (variously Florida State or FSU) in the sport of softball. Florida State competes in Division I of the National Collegiate Athletics Association (NCAA) and the Atlantic Coast Conference (ACC).

In the forty-five year history of the Seminoles softball program, the team has won eighteen ACC championships, two AIAW slow-pitch national championships, and one NCAA championship. Florida State has made thirty-four appearances in the NCAA Tournament, advancing to the Women's College World Series on eleven occasions, reaching the semifinals on four occasions and the championship series on two occasions. Jessica van der Linden and Lacey Waldrop have won the USA Softball Collegiate Player of the Year award while thirty-five Seminole players have been honored as All-Americans while seven have been drafted into the National Pro Fastpitch League and one has been drafted into the Women Professional Fastpitch League.

The Seminoles play their home games at JoAnne Graf Field on the university's Tallahassee, Florida campus, and are currently led by head coach Lonni Alameda.

Program history
Florida State has been one of the most successful softball programs in the history of collegiate softball. As of the end of the 2021 season, only nine teams in the history of the NCAA have made more WCWS appearances than FSU, and no school east of Arizona has been to more NCAA Tournaments than the Seminoles. Florida State has made a regional appearance every year since 2000. Florida State has never endured a losing season and the Seminoles have achieved 38 forty-win seasons; under head coach Lonni Alameda, the Seminoles have achieved 12 forty-win seasons, including eight straight from 2012 to 2019, and won six consecutive ACC titles from 2014 to 2019.

2018 season
The 2018 season saw the Seminoles win the ACC regular season title for the sixth consecutive year and the ACC tournament title for the fifth consecutive year, defeating Pittsburgh in the ACC championship game with a walk-off homerun. securing a spot in the NCAA Tournament as the sixth overall seed. The Seminoles defeated Auburn and Jacksonville State twice to win the Tallahassee Regional and advance to the Tallahassee Super Regional, where they defeated LSU in a double header after dropping the first game of the series, clinching a spot in the Women's College World Series.

In the World Series, the Seminoles dropped their opener to UCLA after blowing a late lead; they went on to win their next four games: defeating Georgia, top-seed Oregon, and UCLA twice in the semifinals to advance to the national championship for the first time to face Washington. Florida State went on to sweep the Huskies to win the national title, becoming the first team to lose their first game in the World Series and go on to win the title during the championship series era. The Seminoles also tied the record for most elimination game wins, going 6-0 over the course of the postseason.

Venue

The softball team plays at the Seminole Softball Complex; the field is named for JoAnne Graf, the winningest coach in school history and the second-winningest coach in college softball history.

Head coaches
Records are through the 2022 season

Current Coaching Staff

Records and results

Year-by-year results

Note: W = Wins, L = Losses, T = Ties, C = Conference

All-time record vs. ACC teams
Florida State softball maintains a winning percentage against all current ACC teams.

Rivalries

College World Series
Florida State has made 11 trips to the Women's College World Series, winning the title in 2018 and finishing as runner-up in 2021.

Championships

National championships

Conference regular season championships

Division championships

Conference tournament championships
Florida State has made twenty-four appearances in the ACC Championship, with a 18-6 record.

Awards

USA Softball Collegiate Player of the Year

Broderick Award

Gold Glove Award

All-Americans
Serita Brooks
Jessica Burroughs
Susan Buttery
Myssi Calkins 
Darby Cottle
Danielle Cox 
Lisa Davidson 
Natalie Drouin 
Renee Espinoza 
Kristy Fuentes
Toni Gutierrez 
Kylee Hanson 
Casey Hunter 
Meghan King
Morgan Klaeveman 
Christy Larsen
Cindy Lawton 
Marla Looper
Leslie Malerich 
Susan Painter 
Alex Powers
Toni Robinette 
Kathryn Sandercock
Sydney Sherrill
Jan Sikes 
Brandi Stuart 
Jessica van der Linden
Elisa Vasquez
Lacey Waldrop
Jessie Warren 
Shamalene Wilson 
Veronica Wootson

Conference awards
ACC Player of the Year – Toni Gutierrez (1992), Cindy Lawton (1995), Shamalene Wilson (1996), Jessica van der Linden (2003, 2004), Maddie O'Brien (2014), Alex Powers (2016), Jessica Warren (2017, 2018)
ACC Defensive Player of the Year – Jessica Warren (2017), Sydney Sherrill (2019, 2021, 2022)
ACC Pitcher of the Year – Sarah Hamilton (2009), Lacey Waldrop (2014, 2015), Jessica Burroughs (2016, 2017), Kylee Hanson (2018)
ACC Freshman of the Year - Shamalene Wilson (1993), Kristy Hull (1995), Jessica van der Linden (2001), Veronica Wootson (2004), Tiffany McDonald (2005), Monica Montez (2007), Jessica Warren (2015), Sydney Sherrill (2018)
ACC Coach of the Year – JoAnne Graf (1992, 1993, 1997, 2001, 2003, 2004), Lonni Alameda (2013, 2014, 2015, 2016, 2017)

Retired jerseys

See also
Florida State Seminoles
Florida State Seminoles baseball
History of Florida State University
List of Florida State University professional athletes

References

External links
  Seminoles.com – Official website of the Florida State Seminoles softball team.